Giacomo Casoli (born 15 September 1988) is an Italian professional football player who plays as a midfielder for  club Casertana.

Career
On 5 June 2012 Spezia bought the other half part of property by Fiorentina.

On 12 September 2018, he was signed by Gubbio on a free transfer.

On 31 January 2019, he signed with Catanzaro.

On 25 August 2021, he joined Fidelis Andria.

On 29 July 2022, Casoli moved to Casertana in Serie D.

Honours
Spezia
 Lega Pro Prima Divisione: 2011–12 (Group B)
 Supercoppa di Serie C: 2012

References

External links
 
 

1988 births
Living people
Sportspeople from the Province of Catanzaro
Footballers from Calabria
Italian footballers
Association football midfielders
Serie B players
Serie C players
Lega Pro Seconda Divisione players
Serie D players
A.S. Gubbio 1910 players
A.C. Isola Liri players
ACF Fiorentina players
A.S.D. Cassino Calcio 1924 players
Spezia Calcio players
F.C. Pro Vercelli 1892 players
Empoli F.C. players
U.S. Cremonese players
Como 1907 players
Matera Calcio players
U.S. Catanzaro 1929 players
S.S. Fidelis Andria 1928 players
Casertana F.C. players